Granulina hedleyi is a species of very small sea snail, a marine gastropod mollusk or micromollusk in the family Granulinidae.

Description

Distribution
This marine species occurs off New Caledonia.

References

 Boyer, F., 2003. Les genres Granulina et Dentimargo (Gastropoda: Marginellidae) dans le domaine côtier de la Nouvelle-Calédonie. Novapex 4(4): 79-92

Granulinidae
Gastropods described in 2003